William Smith (1872–unknown) was an English footballer who played in the Football League for Wolverhampton Wanderers.

References

1872 births
Date of death unknown
English footballers
Association football forwards
English Football League players
Willenhall F.C. players
Wolverhampton Wanderers F.C. players
Portsmouth F.C. players